Feride is a Turkish and Albanian feminine given name. Notable people with the name include:
 Feride Acar (born 1948), Turkish international expert on women and gender
 Feride Akgün (born 1973), Turkish former footballer
 Feride Hilal Akın (born 1996), Turkish pop singer and songwriter
 Feride Bakır (born 1992), Turkish-German female football defender
 Feride Hanımsultan (1847–1920), Ottoman princess
 Feride Kastrati (born 1993), Kosovar footballer 
 Feride Rushiti, Kosovan activist

References 

Albanian feminine given names
Turkish feminine given names